Kramgoa låtar 9 is a 1981 Vikingarna studio album. The album was rereleased to CD in 1988. and 1996. In December 1999, Aftonbladet's Michael Nystås appointed the album the "best dansband album of the 20th century". The album is also one of the titles in the 1999 book Tusen svenska klassiker.

Track listing

Charts

References

External links 

 

1981 albums
Vikingarna (band) albums
Mariann Grammofon albums